"Conscious uncoupling" is a neologism used in the 21st century to refer to a relatively amicable marital divorce. The term was created by Katherine Woodward Thomas in 2009 as a five-step process to support the conscious completion of an intimate relationship and popularized by Gwyneth Paltrow in 2014, who used the phrase to describe her then-recent divorce.

Background 
Starting in the early 1940s the word "uncoupling" became a term for divorce.

Sociologist Diane Vaughan proposed an "uncoupling theory" in 1976. Vaughan saw the process where a relationship reaches a crossroads, when both parties realize that "everything went dead inside". It usually is followed by a lengthy phase, during which one of the partners (the "respondent") holds on to the failing relationship, in spite of unconsciously knowing that it is coming to the end.

Vaughan perceived the process of the breakup affecting the initiator and respondent unevenly. While the breakup initiator 'has begun mourning the loss of the relationship', the respondent has not. Vaughan suggests that 'to make their own transition out of the relationship, partners must redefine initiator and relationship negatively, legitimating the dissolution'.

Vaughan proposed that 'getting out of a relationship includes a redefinition of self at several levels: in the private thoughts of the individual, between partners, and in the larger social context in which the relationship exists'.

Vaughan sees the uncoupling process as finished when 'the partners have defined themselves and are defined by others as separate and independent of each other - when being partners is no longer a major source of identity'.

Usage
In 2009 Katherine Woodward Thomas introduced "conscious uncoupling" as a five-step program which she offered as a calmer alternative to divorce, and began educating people about it worldwide. She also began training and certifying coaches to take people through the conscious uncoupling process.

Gwyneth Paltrow popularized the term to describe her divorce from Chris Martin. In 2014, when Paltrow made the news about her divorce public, she invited her doctors Habib Sadeghi and his wife, Sherry Sami, to explain the process. Sadeghi described a "conscious uncoupling is the ability to understand that every irritation and argument [within a marriage] was a signal to look inside ourselves and identify a negative internal object that needed healing". The process was also labeled as "Uncoupling with Clarity".

In 2015, Conscious Uncoupling: 5 Steps to Living Happily Even After by Katherine Woodward Thomas, became a New York Times best-seller.

References

Further reading

Divorce